Fog is a visible mass consisting of cloud water droplets or ice crystals suspended in the air at or near the Earth's surface.

Fog may also refer to:

Poetry and books
 "Fog" (poem), by Carl Sandburg
 Fog, a 1933 novel by Valentine Williams and Dorothy Rice Sims
 The Fog (novel), a 1975 British horror novel by James Herbert

Film and television
The Fog (1923 film), 1923 American silent drama film directed by Paul Powell
 Fog (1932 film), a French Spanish-language drama
 Fog (1933 film), an American pre-Code film
 The Fog (1980 film), a 1980 American horror film
 The Fog (soundtrack)
 The Fog (2005 film), an American-Canadian remake of the 1980 horror film
 "The Fog" (Mad Men), a 2009 episode of the American television series

Music
 Fog (band), an American indie rock band
 "Fog", a song by Radiohead released on the single "Knives Out"
 "Fog (Again)", a song by Radiohead released on the compilation Com Lag
 "Fog", a song by Italian death metal band Sadist from Lego
 "The Fog", a song by English singer Kate Bush from her 1989 album The Sensual World
 Mgła (English: Fog), a Polish black metal band

People
 Fog (surname), list of people with the surname

Places
 Fog Bay, Antarctica
 Fog Bay, Northern Territory, Australia
 Fog Bay and Finniss River Floodplains, Australia
 Foggia "Gino Lisa" Airport, Italy
 Forest Gate railway station, England

Science and engineering
 Fats, Oils and Grease (FOG); see Grease trap
 FOG1, friend of GATA1, a protein encoded by the ZFPM1 gene
 Distance fog, a technique in 3D rendering
 Fibre optic gyroscope
 Fog computing
 Gunning fog index, a measure of text readability
 FOG Project

Other uses
 Fear, obligation and guilt, emotional blackmail
 FOG Inc., a Japanese video game developer
 Full On Games, a Japanese video game developer

See also
 
 Fogg (disambiguation)
 Fogge (disambiguation)
 Fogging (disambiguation)
 Phog (disambiguation)
 London fog (disambiguation)
 San Francisco fog